Soundane Cut is a deep canal carrying water from Ujani dam located on Bhima River. The cut is located near village Soundane in Mohol Taluka, Solapur District of Maharashtra State, India.

Canals in India
Agriculture in Maharashtra
Solapur district